Papilio antimachus, the African giant swallowtail, is a butterfly in the family Papilionidae. The wings are long and narrow and the ground colour is orange brown with black markings. P. antimachus live in the tropical rainforests of west and central Africa. The distribution area (range) stretches from Angola, Cameroon, Democratic Republic of the Congo, Republic of the Congo, Gabon, Ghana, Ivory Coast, Liberia, Nigeria, Sierra Leone, and Uganda. It is much rarer in the west of its range (Guinea to Cameroon) than in the eastern parts of its range. It probably stays in forest canopy but males come down to mud-puddle. The male is larger than the female and can be seen in groups at nectar. The females show themselves less, continually flying high above the treetops. It has been seen hill-topping in Liberia. The butterfly may have no natural enemies because it is very toxic. The larval foodplant is unknown and nothing is published on the early stages (egg, larva, pupa). Cardiac glycosides found in the Imago by Miriam Rothschild  indicate that the so-far unidentified larva, most probably, sequesters foodplant toxins which persist through pupation into the imago as an aposematic protection against predation, and therefore that the larval foodplant is probably an asclepiad vine.

Subspecies
Papilio antimachus antimachus — Guinea, Sierra Leone, Liberia, Ivory Coast, Ghana, Togo, southern Nigeria, Cameroon, Gabon, Congo, Central African Republic, western Democratic Republic of the Congo, southern Sudan, northern Angola
Papilio antimachus parva  Jackson, 1956 — eastern Democratic Republic of the Congo, Uganda

References

External links
Butterflycorner Images from Naturhistorisches Museum Wien
Tropical and subtropical moist broadleaf forests - WWF Terrestrial Ecoregions

antimachus
Butterflies of Africa
Butterflies described in 1782
Insects of West Africa